Jasper Morris (born 27 December 1957) is a British Master of Wine since 1985. An expert on the wine of Burgundy, with a strong interest in other pinot-producing countries such as New Zealand, he has taken a strong interest in the nascent wine industries of China and Japan, visiting the wine regions of both countries.

Biography
Morris founded the successful specialist wine importers Morris & Verdin in 1981. He studied to become a Master of Wine concurrently with Jancis Robinson, MW, and with his sister Arabella Woodrow, MW, Morris achieving the accreditation in 1985 and Woodrow in 1986.  Morris and Woodrow are the only pair of siblings to be Masters of Wine.

After Berry Bros. & Rudd acquired Morris & Verdin in 2003, Morris was appointed BBR buying director. In May 2008, Morris, together with colleagues at BBR, published "The Future of Wine Report", speculating on the state of the wine industry in the coming 50 years. He retired from the company in July 2017.

In 2016 Morris was appointed as Senior Consult for Christie's with responsibility for the annual Hospices de Beaune Wine Auction. Since 2021 he has continued in the same role for Sotheby’s.

Morris' early book publications are White Wines of Burgundy, and The Wines of the Loire. In September 2010, Morris presented his substantial book Inside Burgundy, which won the André Simon prize, the initial launch publication of the new BBR publishing division, Berry Bros. & Rudd Press.

Having retired from commerce Jasper Morris has embarked on a new career as Burgundy expert and critic, culminating in the launch of the website Jasper Morris Inside Burgundy in September 2018. The Second edition also won the André Simon prize in 2021.

Bibliography

Awards and recognition
 1985 - Master of Wine
 2005 - Chevalier de l’Ordre de Mérite Agricole
 2010, 2022 - André Simon Book Award

See also
List of wine personalities

References

Living people
Wine critics
Masters of Wine
British expatriates in France
Place of birth missing (living people)
1957 births